The 2008 Baltic League (known as the 2008 Triobet Baltic League for sponsorship reasons) was the second Baltic League football tournament. The tournament took place in the Baltic states in 2008. The first matches took place on 4 March.

The draw for the 2008 Baltic League took place in Riga, Latvia, on 12 January 2008.

Group stage

Group A

Group B

Group C

Group D

Knockout stage

Bracket

Quarter-finals

FK Rīga win 5–3 on aggregate

Skonto FC win 6–3 on aggregate

FBK Kaunas win 8–3 on aggregate

FK Ventspils win 4–0 on aggregate

Semi-finals

Skonto FC win 8–2 on aggregate

FBK Kaunas win 2–1 on aggregate

Final

Top scorers
8 goals:
  Aleksandrs Cauņa

5 goals:

  Rafael Ledesma
  Mihails Miholaps

4 goals:

  Vladimir Dvalishvili
  Oļegs Laizāns
  Andrejs Perepļotkins

3 goals:

  Luka Aničič
  Vladimirs Bespalovs
  Andrius Puotkalis
  Valdas Trakys

2 goals:

  Ričardas Beniušis
  Kristaps Blanks
  Imants Bleidelis
  Grigoriy Chirkin
  Georgi Kalaydzhiev
  Arkadiusz Klimek
  Aleksejs Koļesņikovs
  Artis Lazdiņš
  Darius Maciulevičius
  Aleksandr Mysikov
  Marians Pahars
  Aleksandr Pavlihhin
  Jozef Piaček
  Vygantas Zubavičius
  Nerijus Valskis
  Egidijus Varnas
  Aleksejs Višņakovs

References

External links
 

2008
2008 in Estonian football
2008 in Latvian football
2008 in Lithuanian football